Beatrice of Castile may refer to:

 Beatrice of Castile (1242–1303), married to Afonso III of Portugal
 Beatrice of Castile, Marchioness of Montferrat (1254–1286), married to William VII, Marquess of Montferrat
 Beatrice of Castile (1293–1359), married to Afonso IV of Portugal
 Beatrice of Castile (died 1409), mother of Enrique Pérez de Guzmán, 2nd Count de Niebla